Ouadi Jezzine,  is a  village in the Jezzine District of the South Governorate of Lebanon, about 75 km  south of Beirut.

History
In 1838, Eli Smith noted  Wady Jezzin  as a village by Jezzin, "East of et-Tuffa".

References

Bibliography

External links
Ouadi Jezzine, localiban

Populated places in Jezzine District